777 Naval Air Squadron was a Fleet Requirements Unit which was formed in West Africa during the Second World War.

History
The squadron was formed at RAF Hastings in Sierra Leone, West Africa on 1 August 1941. This airfield was located  South East of the port city of Freetown, and was sited about  North East of the village of Hastings.
The squadron initially operated only Fairey Swordfish and Blackburn Roc aircraft. However, by 1942 the squadron had acquired some Boulton Paul Defiant and Supermarine Walrus aircraft.

In March 1943, the control of the airfield was given over to the Admiralty and was given the name HMS Spurwing, but the airfield was also known as RNAS Hastings.

Second World War
During 1943, 777 squadron was involved with the air defence of Sierra Leone, a task which they fulfilled for most of the year.

Between 1942 and 1944, the squadron flew Walrus amphibious aircraft on search and rescue sorties as well as anti-submarine patrols.

During the squadron's existence, there were several accidents in April, June and October 1944, three Target Tug Boulton Paul Defiants belonging to the squadron were written off. It seems that in all three of these incidents, there were no fatalities.

Sub-Lieutenant D.R. Bentley died on 9 June 1943.

777 Squadron disbanded on 25 December 1944.

Post war
The squadron was reformed on 23 May 1945 from 'B' Flight 778 Naval Air Squadron as a trials unit for service aboard  using a variety of aircraft including Supermarine Seafire's and de Havilland Mosquito's.

Aircraft operated
The squadron operated a variety of different aircraft and versions:
 Blackburn Roc I
 Supermarine Walrus
 Fairey Swordfish I & II
 Boulton Paul Defiant TT.1
 Vought Kingfisher I
 Fairey Firefly I
 Vought Corsair III
 Grumman Avenger I
 Fairey Barracuda II
 Grumman Hellcat I
 Taylorcraft Auster I
 Supermarine Seafire
 de Havilland Mosquito FB.VI & B.25

References

Citations

Bibliography

700 series Fleet Air Arm squadrons
Military units and formations established in 1941
Military units and formations of the Royal Navy in World War II